A civil society organization (CSO) is a group of people that operates in the community in a way that is distinct from both government and business. Please see:

Civil society
Non-governmental organisation
Social movement organisation